Thalerastria is a genus of moths of the family Noctuidae. The genus was described by Staudinger in 1898.

Taxonomy
Butterflies and Moths of the World gives this name as a synonym of Eulocastra Butler, 1886.

Species
Thalerastria alfierii Wiltshire, 1948 Arabia
Thalerastria diaphora (Staudinger, 1878) Algeria, Morocco, Turkey, Israel, Jordan, Lebanon, Armenia, Syria, Iran, Iraq, Kazakhstan, Afghanistan, Pakistan, southern European Russia, Arabia, Egypt, Sudan, Eritrea, India
Thalerastria hampsoni (Hacker, 2016) Somalia
Thalerastria lehmanni Hoppe & Fibiger, 2009 Morocco, Libya, Tunisia, Spain
Thalerastria meyi (Hacker, 2016) South Africa
Thalerastria ochrographa (Hacker & Saldaitis, 2016) Oman
Thalerastria phaeoxantha (Hacker, 2016) Ethiopia, Kenya
Thalerastria rex Wiltshire, 1948 Arabia
Thalerastria saldaitis (Hacker, 2016) Sokotra
Thalerastria tenuifascia (Hacker, 2016) Kenya

References

Acontiinae